The Abbé Pierre François Guyot-Desfontaines (1685 in Rouen – 16 December 1745 in Paris) was a French journalist, translator and popular historian.

Known today for his quarrels with Voltaire, Desfontaines can be regarded as the founder of the new literary criticism and journalism in France, insofar as he sought to found his criticism on aesthetic and ethical lines, rather than merely summarising, reproducing or paraphrasing.

Biography
Desfontaines entered the order of Jesuits after being raised by them, and taught rhetoric in Bourges before devoting himself exclusively to letters until 1715. In 1724, he became a contributor to the Journal des scavans, attempting to introduce an amenity of style into his scientific articles, avoiding dryness and pedantry.

He then published, with various collaborators such as Élie Fréron, Granet, the Abbé Destrées, periodical collections of criticism: Le Nouvelliste du Parnasse [The Short-Story Writer of Parnassus] (1731–1734, 5 vols.), and Observations sur les écrits modernes [Observations on modern writing] (1735 on, 34 vols.). These hastily written periodicals distinguished themselves by the vivacity of their criticism and partisanship.

Desfontaines notably attacked the dramatic works of Voltaire, who had earlier helped clear the abbé's name when, accused of sodomy, he spent time in prison in 1724, and had also used his influence to help him return to Paris after his exile. Voltaire retorted with a lampoon entitled Le Préservatif, ou critique des Observations sur les écrits modernes [The Counterpoison, or criticism on Observations on modern writing] (1738), which Desfontaines answered anonymously with a short satirical writing entitled La Voltairomanie (1738), which compiled all the scandalous anecdotes defaming its author at the time. This last saw a libel action which Voltaire only gave up after Desfontaines repudiated the work in the Amsterdam Gazette of 4 April 1739. The war continued several years, so that today the memory of Desfontaines is only perpetuated by the epigrams of Voltaire, and those of Alexis Piron, a one-time ally of Voltaire who promised to bring the abbé an epigram every morning, and did so for fifty days.

Works
Apologie du caractère des Anglois et des François [Apology for the character of the English and the French], 1725
Dictionnaire néologique à l'usage des beaux esprits du siècle [Neological dictionary for the use of modern wits], 1726
Lettres d'un rat calotin à Citron Barbet; Relation de ce qui s’est passé au sujet de l'illustre Mathanasius à l'Académie françoise, [Letters of a churchgoing rat at Citron Barbet; Account of what happened on the subject of the famous Mathanasius at the Académie françoise] 1727
Translation of Jonathan Swift's Gulliver's Travels, 1727
Entretiens sur les Voyages de Cyrus, [Talks on the Voyages of Cyrus] 1728
Nouvelle Histoire de France par demandes et par réponses [New history of France by questions and answers], 1730
Le Nouveau Gulliver, [The New Gulliver] 1730
Nouvelle Histoire de France, [New History of France] 1730
La Voltairomanie, 1738
Racine vengé, ou examen des remarques de l'abbé d'Olivet sur les œuvres de Racine, [Racine avenged, or examination of the remarks of the abbé of Olivet on the works of Racine] 1739. 
 Traduction en prose des poèmes de Virgile [Prose translation of the poems of Virgil], 1743
Lettre d'un comédien françois au sujet de l'Histoire du théâtre italien [Letter of a French actor on the History of the Italian theatre]

References
 Benoit Léger, « Voyages de Desfontaines dans la Romancie : le Nouveau Gulliver (1730) », Préfaces romanesques, Peeters, Leuven et Paris, collection « La République des Lettres », 23, p. 219–231.
 Benoit Léger « Le Médecin observateur : paratexte et traduction idéologique de L'État de la médecine de Francis Clifton par Desfontaines (1742) », Annie Cointre, La traduction de textes non romanesques au XVIIIe siècle, Série 2003, n° 5, Université de Metz, Centre d'études de la traduction p. 215–231.
Benoit Léger, « Nouvelles aventures de Gulliver à Blefuscu : traductions, retraductions et rééditions des Voyages de Gulliver sous la monarchie de Juillet » (« Histoire de la traduction et traduction de l'histoire ») Meta, 49, 3, p. 526–543.
 Hugues Plaideux, « L'abbé Desfontaines : un adversaire de Voltaire à la cure de Torigni (1732–1734) », Revue de la Manche, fasc. 159, avril 1998, p. 31–37.
Caterina Marrone,Le lingue utopiche, Nuovi Equilibri, Viterbo, 2004 [1995], p. 338,

External links
 
 
 

1685 births
1745 deaths
18th-century French writers
18th-century LGBT people
18th-century French male writers
18th-century French journalists
French male non-fiction writers
French LGBT journalists
French gay writers
People convicted of sodomy
Writers from Rouen
Translators of Virgil